This page provides supplementary chemical data on glycerol.

Material Safety Data Sheet  

The handling of this chemical may incur notable safety precautions. It is highly recommended that you seek the Material Safety Datasheet (MSDS) for this chemical from a reliable source and follow its directions.

Structure and properties

Thermodynamic properties

Vapor pressure of liquid

Table data obtained from CRC Handbook of Chemistry and Physics, 44th ed.

log10 of Glycerol vapor pressure. Uses formula:  obtained from CHERIC

Freezing point of aqueous solutions

Table data obtained from Lange's Handbook of Chemistry, 10th ed. Specific gravity is at 15°C, referenced to water at 15°C.

See details on: Freezing Points of Glycerine-Water Solutions Dow Chemical
 or Freezing Points of Glycerol and Its Aqueous Solutions.

Distillation data

Spectral data

References

Chemical data pages
Chemical data pages cleanup